A Portrait of Patsy Cline is a 1964 compilation album containing lesser-known recordings by American country music singer Patsy Cline. It was released on June 15, 1964, on Decca Records, and would later be reissued twice by Decca's successor, MCA Records.

Background
A Portrait contained Patsy Cline's less-familiar recordings, including country and pop standards. The album's highlights includes her cover versions of "Faded Love" and "Blue Moon of Kentucky".
A Portrait of Patsy Cline would be one of a string of posthumous released Decca and later MCA records would release. It was released a little over a year after Cline was killed in a plane crash. The album spawned three singles that were released to country radio between 1963-64: "Faded Love," (which was a Top ten hit), "When You Need a Laugh" and "Your Kinda Love".

In 1973, the album was reissued by MCA Records (Decca's successor), then digitally remastered and reissued on CD/LP/Cassette in 1988. It was also released in the UK by Brunswick Records in 1964, as well as Australia and New Zealand by Festival Records the same year. The album was one of two Patsy Cline albums released by Decca Records in 1964. The other was That's How a Heartache Begins, released shortly after.

Track listing

Side one
"Faded Love" (Bob Wills, John Wills) - 3:43
"I'll Sail My Ship Alone" (Henry Bernard, Morry Burns, Lois Mann, Henry Thurston) - 2:20
"When You Need a Laugh" (Hank Cochran) - 2:45
"Crazy Arms" (Ralph Mooney, Chuck Seals) - 2:23
"Always (Irving Berlin) - 2:40
"When I Get Thru with You" (Harlan Howard) - 2:34

Side two
"Blue Moon of Kentucky" (Bill Monroe) - 2:02
"Someday (You'll Want Me to Want You)" (Jimmie Hodges) - 2:49
"Who Can I Count On" (Sammy Masters) - 2:14
"You Took Him Off My Hands" (Howard, Skeets McDonald, Wynn Stewart) - 2:58
"Your Kinda Love" (Roy Drusky) - 2:29
"Does Your Heart Beat for Me" (Arnold Johnson, Russ Morgan, Mitchell Parish) - 2:37

Personnel
Harold Bradley - electric guitar
Owen Bradley - producer
Patsy Cline - vocals
Floyd Cramer - piano, organ
Ray Edenton - rhythm guitar
Buddy Harman - drums
Hoyt Hawkins - backing vocals
Randy Hughes - rhythm guitar
Joe Jenkins - bass
Grady Martin - electric guitar
Neal Matthews - backing vocals
Bob Moore - bass
Wayne Moss - electric bass
Bill Pursell - vibraphone
Hargus "Pig" Robbins - piano
Gordon Stoker - backing vocals
Ray C. Walker - backing vocals
Rita Faye Wilson - autoharp

Chart positions
Singles - Billboard (North America)

References

1964 albums
Patsy Cline albums
Albums produced by Owen Bradley
Albums published posthumously
Decca Records albums
MCA Records albums